Several ships of the Royal Navy have been named HMS Hyacinth after the hyacinth flower:

 , launched in 1806, was an 18-gun , broken up in 1820.
 , launched in 1829, was a sixth-rate sloop. In 1839, fighting alongside , she destroyed 29 Chinese ships near Hong Kong. This battle was the first of many decisive victories of the British over the Qing Dynasty's military in the First Opium War.
 , launched in 1881, was a  corvette. She served on the China station and was sold for breaking in 1902.
 , launched in 1898, was a  light cruiser. She served in the First World War and was scrapped in 1923.
She served in the Second World War, was loaned to the Royal Hellenic Navy in 1943 and renamed Apostolis.

Royal Navy ship names

ru:Гиацинт (корвет)